McLeod Glacier is a glacier  long, flowing in a southeasterly direction into Clowes Bay on the south side of Signy Island, in the South Orkney Islands off Antarctica. It was named by the UK Antarctic Place-Names Committee in 1954 for Michael McLeod, following a survey by the Falkland Islands Dependencies Survey in 1947.

See also
 List of glaciers in the Antarctic
 Glaciology

References

Glaciers of the South Orkney Islands